Dick Armstrong may refer to:

 Richard Lee Armstrong (1937–1991), American/Canadian geologist
 Dick Armstrong (footballer) (1909–1969), English footballer

See also
 Richard Armstrong (disambiguation)